Patricia McGovern is an attorney and former Democratic Massachusetts State Senator from Lawrence, Massachusetts. She was formerly the General Counsel and Senior Vice President for Corporate and Community Affairs at Beth Israel Deaconess Medical Center.

Biography 
McGovern holds a bachelor's degree and law degree from Suffolk University. She also studied at The Hague Academy of International Law.<ref
name=BIDMC></ref>

McGovern served in the Massachusetts Senate for 12 years, from 1981 to 1993, and was the first woman to chair the powerful Massachusetts Senate Committee on Ways and Means.  While the Chair of that Committee McGovern was the principal architect of the first serious effort in Massachusetts to enact a universal health insurance law. Under her stewardship, such a law was enacted in 1988 – with the controversial inclusion of a payroll tax – but the law was never implemented by the newly elected Governor of the Commonwealth, the Republican William Weld, because of his opposition to the payroll tax. However, Michael Dukakis used the enactment of the universal health care law on the campaign trail in his run for the U.S. Presidency, notwithstanding that McGovern had done most of the hard lifting in getting it enacted.

In 1998 McGovern sought the Democratic nomination for Governor of Massachusetts but lost to Scott Harshbarger. She received 31 percent of the vote.

McGovern has also served as Executive Vice President for External Affairs at CareGroup Healthcare System and practiced law at the Boston law firm of Goulston & Storrs. In addition, she was the executive director of the Governor's Committee on Law Enforcement and the Administration of Justice in the Executive Office of Public Safety, and has participated in a number of Blue Ribbon Committees and Commissions, including most recently the Transportation Finance Commission. She became senior vice president for corporate and community affairs at Beth Israel Deaconess Medical Center and also became its general counsel in 2005 before stepping down in 2012.

The Senator Patricia McGovern Transportation Center in Lawrence, Massachusetts is named for the former senator. The center, which opened in 2005, is a bus and train station serving Lawrence and the neighboring towns of Andover and North Andover.

See also
 Massachusetts Senate's 2nd Essex and Middlesex district

References 

Living people
Politicians from Lawrence, Massachusetts
Massachusetts lawyers
Democratic Party Massachusetts state senators
Suffolk University alumni
The Hague Academy of International Law people
Suffolk University Law School alumni
Year of birth missing (living people)
Women state legislators in Massachusetts
21st-century American women